Blepharipoda occidentalis, the spiny sand crab or spiny mole crab, is a species of sand crab or mole crab which lives in the eastern Pacific Ocean, from Central California to Baja California. It lives on sandy beaches up to  under water, and feeds on the remains of other sand crabs that live in the area.

References

Hippoidea
Crustaceans of the eastern Pacific Ocean
Crustaceans described in 1840